The Politburo of the 18th Congress of the All-Union Communist Party (Bolsheviks) was in session from 1939 to 1952.

Composition

Members

Candidates

References

Politburo of the Central Committee of the Communist Party of the Soviet Union members
Politburo
Politburo
Politburo
Politburo
Politburo
Politburo
Politburo
Politburo